Real to Reel may refer to:

 Real to Reel (Marillion album), 1984
 Real to Reel (Starcastle album), 1978
 Real to Reel (Tesla album), 2007 
 Real to Reel, a 1979 album by Climax Blues Band
 Sound City: Real to Reel, the soundtrack to the 2013 documentary film Sound City
 Real to Reel International Film Festival, an American film festival

See also
 Reel to Real (disambiguation)
 Reel to reel (disambiguation)